Rolf Gehring was the defending champion, but lost in the semifinals this year.

Chris Lewis won the title, defeating Christophe Roger-Vasselin 4–6, 6–2, 2–6, 6–1, 6–1 in the final.

Seeds

  Eliot Teltscher (second round)
  Rolf Gehring (semifinals)
  Shlomo Glickstein (quarterfinals)
  Chris Lewis (champion)
  Butch Walts (quarterfinals)
  Pavel Složil (quarterfinals)
  Christophe Roger-Vasselin (final)
  Ulrich Pinner (semifinals)

Draw

Final

Section 1

Section 2

External links
 1981 Bavarian Tennis Championships Singles draw

Singles